Jaunpiebalga Parish is an administrative unit of Cēsis Municipality in the Vidzeme region of Latvia.

Towns, villages and settlements of Jaunpiebalga parish 
 Jaunpiebalga
 Abrupe

Parishes of Latvia
Cēsis Municipality
Vidzeme